Gwadar Development Authority (GDA;Urdu: گوادر ڈویلپمنٹ اتھارٹی) is a public and government sector corporation responsible for providing municipal services in Gwadar City (Southwestern Arabian Sea Coastline of Pakistan), established in October 2003, to improve, enhancement and implement the master plan for Gwadar city.

History 
Starting of work on the Gwadar Port in March 2002, it was expected that there will be a massive growth in Gwadar town and their suburb areas. In order to manage and regulate this huge growth rate, a Gwadar Master Plan was introduced. The Gwadar Development Authority (GDA) was established in October 2003 to improve, enhancement and implement and regulate the Master Plan, which formally suggested only the land use in Gwadar city. After the establishment of the GDA Authority, the internal road network in the city, residential and commercial land zoning, and the vision and mission for the future of Gwadar was developed and finalized.

List of Directorates 
 Directorate of Town Planning
 Directorate of Environment
 Directorate of Administration
 Directorate of Finance and Account
 Directorate of Estate and Land Management

Wings 
Planning Wing
Registration Wing
GIS Wing
Survey Wing
Agricultural Wing
Air Quality Wing
Municipal Wing
Administration Wing
I.T Wing
HRM Wing
Legal Wing
Transport Wing
Staff Welfare Wing
Building Wing
Electrical Wing
Design Section Wing
Road Section Wing
Land Revenue Wing
Land Management Wing
Auditing Wing
Record Section Wing

Services & Incentives 
GDA is committed to develop Gwadar town and its suburb areas as one of the modern cities and a first-class residential and commercial area of Pakistan and around the world. There isn't a single piece of land owned by the government, so GDA is only a managerial body that:
 Manage the used land and Implement the Master Plan.
 Monitor the public and private schemes and projects daily basis until completion.
 Provide all the facilities that mentioned in the Master Plan to Public.
 Economic Free Zone across Gwadar city.
 Subsidized Electricity for Gwadar city.
 5 Roads that connecti Gwadar city with other neighbor Asian countries like Afghanistan, China and India, and countries in Central Asia.

References 

Public benefit corporations
Urban development authorities
Gwadar District
Government agencies of Balochistan, Pakistan
2003 establishments in Pakistan
Government agencies established in 2003